Yelan is the name of several places in Russia.

Republic of Bashkortostan
Yelan, Republic of Bashkortostan, a village in Ishlinsky Selsoviet of Beloretsky District

Republic of Buryatia
Yelan, Bichursky District, Republic of Buryatia, a selo in Yelansky Selsoviet of Bichursky District
Yelan, Kabansky District, Republic of Buryatia, a selo in Kabansky Selsoviet of Kabansky District

Irkutsk Oblast
Yelan, Cheremkhovsky District, Irkutsk Oblast, a village in Cheremkhovsky District
Yelan, Chunsky District, Irkutsk Oblast, a settlement in Chunsky District

Kemerovo Oblast
Yelan, Kemerovo Oblast, a settlement in Yelanskaya Rural Territory of Novokuznetsky District

Rostov Oblast
Yelan, Rostov Oblast, a khutor in Voykovskoye Rural Settlement of Tarasovsky District

Samara Oblast
Yelan, Samara Oblast, a selo in Khvorostyansky District

Saratov Oblast
Yelan, Saratov Oblast, a selo in Rtishchevsky District

Sverdlovsk Oblast
Yelan, Alapayevsky District, Sverdlovsk Oblast, a village in Alapayevsky District
Yelan, Baykalovsky District, Sverdlovsk Oblast, a selo in Baykalovsky District
Yelan, Talitsky District, Sverdlovsk Oblast, a selo in Talitsky District

Tambov Oblast
Yelan, Tambov Oblast, a settlement in Popovsky Selsoviet of Staroyuryevsky District

Tyumen Oblast
Yelan, Nizhnetavdinsky District, Tyumen Oblast, a selo in Antipinsky Rural Okrug of Nizhnetavdinsky District
Yelan, Tobolsky District, Tyumen Oblast, a village in Khmelevsky Rural Okrug of Tobolsky District
Yelan, Tyumensky District, Tyumen Oblast, a village in Perevalovsky Rural Okrug of Tyumensky District
Yelan, Vagaysky District, Tyumen Oblast, a village in Kularovsky Rural Okrug of Vagaysky District

Volgograd Oblast
Yelan, Volgograd Oblast, a work settlement in Yelansky District

Voronezh Oblast
Yelan (river), a tributary of the river Savala (Don basin)